Mosel is a village (Ortsteil) and a former municipality in the Zwickau district in Saxony, Germany. It was incorporated into the municipality of Zwickau in 1999. Mosel is an economically significant Ortsteil in the Stadtbezirk Zwickau-Nord with the official number 36.

References 

Districts of Zwickau
Former municipalities in Saxony